Slickpoo is an unincorporated community in Lewis County, Idaho, United States founded by Eli Schmickel. It was also named Aishnima.

References

Unincorporated communities in Lewis County, Idaho
Unincorporated communities in Idaho